Tenyayevo (Tänäy) is a rural locality (a selo) and the administrative centre of Tenyayevsky Selsoviet, Fyodorovsky District, Bashkortostan, Russia. The population was 446 as of 2010. There are 6 streets.

Geography 
Tenyayevo is located 9 km northwest of Fyodorovka (the district's administrative centre) by road. Sashino is the nearest rural locality.

References 

Rural localities in Fyodorovsky District